Beatrice is a 1919 Italian silent historical film directed by Herbert Brenon and starring Francesca Bertini. It tells the story of Dante Alighieri's love to Beatrice Portinari, loosely based on Dante's poetry. It appears to be a separate film from Brenon's 1921 film The Stronger Passion, which also had the original title of Beatrice although they may be alternative versions of the same production.

References

Bibliography
 Phillips, Alastair & Vincendeau, Ginette. Journeys of Desire: European Actors in Hollywood. British Film Institute, 2006.

External links

1919 films
1910s historical films
Italian historical films
1910s Italian-language films
Films based on works by Dante Alighieri
Films directed by Herbert Brenon
Films set in the 13th century
Italian silent films
Italian black-and-white films
Works based on La Vita Nuova